Cynthia Shonga (born 18 June 2000) is a Zimbabwean footballer who plays as a goalkeeper for Harare City Queens FC and the Zimbabwe women's national team.

Club career
Shonga played for Harare City in Zimbabwe.

International career
Shonga capped for Zimbabwe at senior level during two COSAFA Women's Championship editions (2020 and 2021).

References

2000 births
Living people
Zimbabwean women's footballers
Women's association football goalkeepers
Zimbabwe women's international footballers